Nogometni klub Nafta Lendava, commonly referred to as NK Nafta Lendava or simply Nafta, was a Slovenian football club which played in the town of Lendava. The club was founded under the Hungarian name Lendvai Football Egyesület in 1903. They were regarded as the oldest Slovenian football club until they filed for bankruptcy and were dissolved following the 2011–12 Slovenian PrvaLiga season. The club played in the Yugoslav First League for one season, in 1946–47.

History 
The club was founded in 1903 under the Hungarian name Lendvai Football Egyesület. After World War I, the club was renamed as NK Lendava, and then as SK Lendava. In the mid-1930s, the club began to play in the second division of the Ljubljana Subassociation League. After the invasion of Yugoslavia in 1941, the Prekmurje region was annexed by the Kingdom of Hungary, and Lendava played in the Hungarian football system during World War II.

In 1946, the club won the first post-war national championship of Slovenia, thus qualifying for the top level Yugoslav First League for the 1946–47 season. Before the season, they also renamed as Nafta. However, they were immediately relegated after finishing dead last with 23 defeats out of 26 league games.

In the following decades, the club mainly played in the Slovenian Republic League and lower leagues in the territory of SR Slovenia.

After Slovenia's independence in 1991, Nafta joined the newly formed Slovenian PrvaLiga for the 1991–92 season. Their Croatian winger Miljenko Dovečer earned the distinction of scoring the very first goal of the new competition. They stayed in the top division for two seasons, as they were relegated in 1992–93 after finishing dead last. In the next decade, they competed in the 2. SNL (second tier) and even one season in the 3. SNL (third tier), before being promoted back to the top level in 2005 after finishing second in the 2004–05 Slovenian Second League.

After the 2011–12 Slovenian PrvaLiga season, Nafta was relegated from the top tier and was dissolved due to bankruptcy. In the same year, the club was refounded as ND Lendava 1903.

Domestic league and cup results

*Best results are highlighted.

Honours
League

Slovenian Republic League
 Winners: 1946

Slovenian Third League
 Winners: 2003–04

References

Association football clubs established in 1903
Defunct football clubs in Slovenia
Football clubs in Yugoslavia
1903 establishments in Hungary
Association football clubs disestablished in 2012
2012 disestablishments in Slovenia